PCB drill file may refer:

 PCB NC formats, a collection of widely used drill file formats in PCB production
 Gerber file format, the de facto standard of data transfer from design to fabrication, and which can transfer drill information